WashAndGo may refer to:

 A shampoo produced by Vidal Sassoon
 A computer program for Microsoft Windows by Abelssoft to remove garbage and unneeded files, see WashAndGo (software)